Audrina is an American reality television series that originally aired on VH1 from April 17, 2011, until June 19, 2011. The series aired one season and focuses on the lives of Audrina Patridge, who came to prominence as a cast member on The Hills, and her family. Its premise was originated with Mark Burnett, who additionally served as the executive producer.

Production
In 2009, MTV ordered a pilot for the series, then titled The Audrina Show, but it was not picked up to series on the network.

In October 2010, Patridge announced that her then-unnamed reality series was picked up by MTV's sister network, VH1, with Mark Burnett as executive producer. Patridge spoke with Us Magazine about the series: "The show with Mark Burnett got picked up by VH1 so the journey continues! It's a reality show about me and my family. Everything that people have wondered about me, they'll now get to see! And I hope Tony [Dovolani, her Dancing with the Stars partner] will be on it! I'd love to make some trips to NY to see him because we are such good friends now!"

In January 2011, VH1 announced the series name, Audrina. In March 2011, the show's first promo aired, announcing that it will premiere on April 17, 2011, at 9:00 PM.

It was announced on September 1, 2011, that the series would not be renewed for a second season. The series' ten-episode run averaged 610,000 viewers.

Cast

1 Only members to receive star billing in opening credits.

Episodes

International airings

Critical reception
John Griffiths of Us Weekly gave the show two stars and wrote, "Sure, siren Audrina Patridge appealed on The Hills. But she fails to yield much reality-star power in this ho-hum series". Brian Lowry of Variety was also negative and wrote, "The whole thing plays like a poor woman's version of Keeping Up with the Kardashians. Audrina poses for a bikini calendar near the outset and discusses moving in with her scamp of a younger brother. 'There's never gonna be a dull moment', she says. Based on the first two episodes, I beg to differ".

References

External links

2010s American reality television series
2011 American television series debuts
2011 American television series endings
American television spin-offs
English-language television shows
Reality television spin-offs
VH1 original programming
The Hills (TV series)